35 Aquilae (abbreviated 35 Aql) is a star in the equatorial constellation of Aquila. 35 Aquilae is its Flamsteed designation though it also bears the Bayer designation c Aquilae. The apparent visual magnitude of this star is 5.8, which means it is a faint star but visible to the naked eye from dark suburban or rural skies. It has an annual parallax shift of 16.34 mas that is caused by the Earth's orbit around the Sun. At this distance, the visual magnitude is diminished by 0.26 from extinction caused by interstellar gas and dust.

The spectrum of 35 Aquilae fits a stellar classification of A0 V, indicating it is an A-type main sequence star. Compared to the Sun, it has 210% of the mass and 180% of the radius. As such, it is much brighter than the Sun, emitting 14 times the luminosity from its outer atmosphere at an effective temperature of 8,939 K. This heat causes it to glow with the white-hot hue of an A-type star. 35 Aquilae is spinning rapidly with a projected rotational velocity of 110 km/s.

In 1994 it was discovered that 35 Aquilae is a variable star with a pulsation period of just 30 minutes. It was determined to be a Delta Scuti variable, which is a type of star found on the instability strip that undergoes short period pulsations. Observation with the Spitzer Space Telescope shows that 35 Aquilae is radiating an excess level of infrared radiation for a star of its type. This excess may be explained by the heating of nearby interstellar dust belonging to a diffuse cloud of material that the star is passing through. This interaction may also explain the Lambda Boötis categorization for this star.

References

External links
 HR 7400
 Image 35 Aquilae

Aquilae, c
Aquilae, 35
Aquilae, V1431
183324
Delta Scuti variables
Aquila (constellation)
095793
7400
BD+01 4010
A-type main-sequence stars